Hoghton is a small village and civil parish in the Borough of Chorley, Lancashire, England. At the 2011 Census, it had a population of 802. Brindle and Hoghton ward also includes the parish of Brindle.

Hoghton Tower is a fortified manor house, and the ancestral home of the de Hoghton family from the 12th century.

Also within the parish are the hamlets of Riley Green and Hoghton Bottoms.  The villages of Gregson Lane and Coupe Green are sometimes described as in Hoghton, although they are outside the parish, forming the ward of Coupe Green and Gregson Lane in the South Ribble district.

A local folk tale tells that two Hoghton poachers once raided a rabbit warren inhabited by fairies. When they heard the fairies' voices coming from the sacks they were carrying, they fled in terror.

The village has two public houses: the Sirloin, which is reputed to be haunted, and the Boar's Head,  which claims to be one of the final overnight stops of the Pendle Witches before their eventual trials and sentencing at Lancaster in 1612.

See also
Listed buildings in Hoghton

References

External links

Hoghton at chorley.gov.uk

 
Villages in Lancashire
Civil parishes in Lancashire
Geography of Chorley